John Knox (4 October 1904 – 10 April 1966) was an Argentine first-class cricketer.

Knox, of Scottish-descent, was born at Buenos Aires in October 1904. He made his debut in first-class cricket for Argentina against the touring Marylebone Cricket Club at Buenos Aires in December 1926, with Knox playing a further four first-class matches against the same opposition the following month. He played two first-class matches for Argentina against a touring Sir J. Cahn's XI in 1930. He was a member of the South American cricket team which toured England in 1932, making five first-class appearances on the tour. His final first-class appearance came for Argentina against Sir T. E. W. Brinckman's XI in 1938. Across twelve first-class matches, Knox scored 575 runs at an average of 31.94, with a high score of 110 not out. This score, which was his only first-class century, came for the South Americans against Sussex. He died at Buenos Aires in April 1966.

References

External links

1904 births
1966 deaths
Cricketers from Buenos Aires
Argentine people of Scottish descent
Argentine cricketers
South Americans cricketers